Rapana may refer to;

Animals
Rapana, a genus of predatory sea snail
Rapana bezoar
Rapana bulbosa
Rapana rapiformis
Rapana pellucida
Rapana venosa

People
Ihakara Te Tuku Rapana (1886–1968), a New Zealand champion sheep shearer and wrestler
Jordan Rapana (b 1989), a New Zealand rugby league player

Ships
, a British tanker that served from 1935 to 1950, converted to a merchant aircraft carrier during World War II